The W-4 Hot Canary is a custom biplane designed for air racing.

Design
The W-4 is a single place conventional geared negative stagger biplane.

Operational history
1970 Florida Sport Biplane consolation race - 1st place
1970 Reno Air Race - 4th place in biplane category - 163 mph average
1971 Reno Air Race

Specifications (W-4 Hot Canary)

References

Racing aircraft
Homebuilt aircraft
Biplanes
Single-engined tractor aircraft
Aircraft first flown in 1969